The Supreme Court of the Republic of Slovenia (Vrhovno sodišče Republike Slovenije) is, according to Article 127 of the Constitution, the highest court in Slovenia. Its seat is in Ljubljana. The court's current president is Damijan Florjančič. Decisions of the Supreme Court can be reviewed by the Constitutional Court if human rights, guaranteed by the constitution or by the European Convention on Human Rights are violated.

The supreme court judges enjoy a permanent mandate.

History 
The Supreme Court of the Republic of Slovenia was formally established on 23 December 1991. In practice, the Supreme Court has operated since 25 June 1991 when Slovenia gained independence from Yugoslavia.

See also 

 Judiciary of Slovenia

References

Footnotes

External links 

 Official website of the Supreme Court of the Republic of Slovenia

Judiciary of Slovenia
1991 establishments in Slovenia
Courts and tribunals established in 1991